Jeffrey Seller (born 1964) is an American theatrical producer best known for his work on Rent (1996), Avenue Q (2003), In the Heights (2008), and Hamilton (2015), as well as inventing Broadway's first rush ticket and lottery ticket policies.

Biography
Raised in a Jewish family, Seller is a 1986 graduate of the University of Michigan. After school, he moved to New York City where he worked, as a publicist, booking agent and producer. With his business partner Kevin McCollum he produced three Best Musical Tony Award-winning Broadway shows; Rent (1996), Avenue Q (2003), and In the Heights (2008).

With increasingly expensive Broadway ticket prices, Seller and McCollum invented Broadway's first rush ticket policy early on in the production of Rent. The idea was to keep the show accessible for people “in their 20s and 30s, artists, Bohemians—the people for whom Jonathan Larson wrote the show.” A select number of front row tickets would be sold for $20 on a first come per-serve basis. Rush tickets became so popular that people began to sleep on the streets outside the theater to get a spot at the front of the line. Out of concern for the safety for those who participated in the Rush policy, Seller and McCollum created Broadway's first lottery ticket policy, which kept cheap tickets accessible to a young audience by selling $20 tickets to the winners of a drawing.

Together Seller and McCollum also produced De La Guarda (1998), Andrew Lippa's The Wild Party (2000), High Fidelity (2006), [title of show] (2008), the revival of West Side Story (2009), and Bengal Tiger at the Bagdad Zoo (2011). They also executive  produced the 2005 film adaption of Rent. In 2012 McCollum and Seller ended their 21-year partnership.

Seller went on to produce Sting's musical The Last Ship (2014) based on the concept album of the same name. After working with Lin-Manuel Miranda on In the Heights, he produced Miranda's next show, Hamilton (2015). Hamilton has gone on to receive widespread critical acclaim and commercial success. In June 2016, Hamilton received 11 Tony awards of a record-breaking 16 nominations, including a Best Musical win for Seller, his fourth Tony Award overall and his first since his separation from McCollum.

Shortly after the debut of Hamilton, Seller directed a workshop of a musical made from Jules Feiffer’s young-adult novel, The Man in the Ceiling.

In March of 2021, Seller took the "Hamilton" production to Australia, selling more than 250,000 tickets before the first preview, which Seller stated was "the largest advance in the history of Australia."

References

External links
 
 
 
 
 Jeffrey Seller at Broadway World
 Jeffrey Seller at Theatrical Index

1964 births
Living people
American theatre managers and producers
University of Michigan alumni
American Jews